The Andorran Red Cross (Catalan: Creu Roja Andorrana) is a humanitarian organization that provides emergency assistance, disaster relief and education within Andorra. The organization was founded in 1980, and was officially recognized as the 162nd National Society member of the International Federation of Red Cross and Red Crescent Societies on March 24, 1994. Its headquarters are in Andorra la Vella.

References

External links
 Official Website
IFRC: Andorran Red Cross Profile

Red Cross and Red Crescent national societies
1980 establishments in Andorra
Organizations established in 1980
Medical and health organisations based in Andorra